Stachyarrhena is a genus of flowering plants belonging to the family Rubiaceae.

Its native range is Panama to Southern Tropical America.

Species:
 Stachyarrhena acuminata Standl. 
 Stachyarrhena acutiloba Steyerm.

References

Cordiereae
Rubiaceae genera